These are the most popular given names in the United States for all years of the 1900s (decade).

1900 

Males
John
William
James
George
Charles
Joseph
Frank
Henry
Robert
Harry
Females
Mary
Helen
Anna
Margaret
Ruth
Elizabeth
Marie
Rose
Florence
Bertha

1901 

Males
John
William
James
Joseph
George
Charles
Frank
Henry
Robert
Edward
Females
Mary
Helen
Anna
Margaret
Elizabeth
Ruth
Marie
Gladys
Florence
Rose

1902 

Males
John
William
James
George
Joseph
Charles
Robert
Frank
Edward
Walter 
Females
Mary
Helen
Anna
Margaret
Ruth
Elizabeth
Marie
Lillian
Florence
Alice; Rose (tie)

1903 

Males
John
William
James
George
Joseph
Charles
Robert
Frank
Walter
Henry
Females
Mary
Margaret
Helen
Anna
Ruth
Marie
Elizabeth
Florence
Dorothy
Lillian

1904 

Males
John
William
George; James (tie)
Joseph
Charles
Robert
Frank
Edward
Walter
-----
Females
Mary
Helen
Margaret
Ruth
Anna
Dorothy; Elizabeth (tie)
Marie
Alice; Florence (tie)
-----
-----

1905 

Males
John
William
James
George
Charles
Joseph
Frank; Robert (tie)
Edward
Thomas
-----
Females
Mary
Helen
Margaret
Anna
Ruth
Dorothy
Elizabeth
Mildred
Lillian
Marie

1906 

Males
John
William
James
Joseph
George
Charles
Robert
Frank
Henry
Edward
Females
Mary
Helen
Margaret
Ruth
Anna
Elizabeth
Dorothy
Marie
Alice
Florence

1907 

Males
John
William 
James
George
Charles
Joseph
Robert
Frank
Thomas; Walter (tie)
-----
Females
Mary
Helen
Margaret
Anna
Ruth
Dorothy
Elizabeth
Mildred
Alice
Ethel

1908 

Males
John
William
James
George
Joseph
Charles
Robert
Frank
Edward
Henry
Females
Mary
Helen
Margaret
Anna
Ruth
Dorothy
Elizabeth
Mildred
Frances
Florence

1909 

Males
John
William
James
George
Joseph
Robert
Charles
Frank
Edward
Henry; Walter (tie)
Females
Mary
Helen
Margaret
Ruth; Dorothy (tie)
Anna
Elizabeth
Mildred
Marie
Alice
-----

References
http://www.ssa.gov/OACT/babynames/index.html
http://www.ssa.gov/OACT/babynames/decades/names1900s.html

1900s
1900s in the United States